Sabine Hertrampf (born 3 January 1955) is a German fencer. She competed in the women's individual and team foil events for East Germany at the 1980 Summer Olympics.

References

1955 births
Living people
People from Oschatz
People from Bezirk Leipzig
German female fencers
Sportspeople from Saxony
Olympic fencers of East Germany
Fencers at the 1980 Summer Olympics
20th-century German women